Major General Jan Krister Lennart Larsson Lagersvärd, né Larsson (14 September 1934 – 22 September 2022) was a senior Swedish Army officer. His senior commands include postings as Chief of the Army Staff and of the General Staff Corps (1983–1988) and head of the Swedish National Defence College from 1988 to 1994.

Early life
Larsson was born on 14 September 1934 in Lund City Parish (Lunds stadsförsamling), Sweden, the son of Lennart Larsson, a farmer, and his wife Kristina (née Bengtsson).

Career
Larsson attended a staff course at the Swedish Armed Forces Staff College from 1964 to 1966 and served in the Army Staff from 1966 to 1976. Larsson served in South Scanian Regiment from 1976 to 1977 and in the Southern Military District from 1977 to 1979 and then attended the Swedish National Defence College in 1979. He served as acting regimental commander of Värmland Regiment from 1979 to 1980 and Planning Director at the Defence Materiel Administration from 1980 to 1983.

In 1983, Larsson attended a staff course in Monterey, California, United States and at the Swedish National Defence College. In 1983, Larsson was also appointed Chief of the Army Staff and of the General Staff Corps. He served in this position for five years before being head of the Swedish National Defence College from 1988 to 1994.

Larsson was an expert in the Swedish Armed Forces Management Investigation (Försvarets ledningsutredning, FLU 74) and in the 1979 Materiel Procurement Commission (1979 års materielanskaffningskommission), chairman of the Swedish Pistol Shooting Association (Svenska pistolskytteförbundet) from 1984 to 1989, chairman of the Swedish Military Sports Association (Sveriges militära idrottsförbund) from 1984, and a board member of the Swedish Ancestry Research Association (Sveriges Släktforskarförbund).

He was chairman of the Swedish Military Sports Association from 1995 to 2000.

Personal life
In 1962, he married Solveig Lagersvärd (née Bergström) (born 1934), the daughter of Arvid and Ingrid Bergström.

Death
Larsson died on 22 September 2022 in Täby.

Dates of rank
1956 – Second lieutenant
19?? – Lieutenant
1966 – Captain
1972 – Major
1972 – Lieutenant colonel
1979 – Colonel
1983 – Major general

Awards and decorations
  Knight of the Order of the Sword (6 June 1974)

Honours
Member of the Royal Swedish Academy of War Sciences (1982)

References

1934 births
2022 deaths
Swedish Army major generals
People from Lund
Members of the Royal Swedish Academy of War Sciences